Dalibor Pandža (born 23 March 1991 in Sarajevo) is a Bosnian professional footballer who plays as a left winger for German club FV Bad Vilbel.

Club career
Dalibor began his career in the youth from FK Sarajevo and was promoted to the Bosnian Premier League team in March 2008. As Pandža is a Bosnian Croat and a great talent, the Croatian Football Federation continued their practice with trying to get these players to play for Croatia rather than Bosnia, and offered Pandža a place in their team. But Pandža declined and stated that he only wanted to play for his country, Bosnia and Herzegovina. This made him very popular among Bosnians even though many had never heard of him or seen him play at the time.

Pandža signed with FK Olimpik in December 2018. In the 2018–19 First League of FBiH season, Pandža scored 7 goals in 14 league games for Olimpik. He left Olimpik in January 2020.

On 23 January 2020 it was confirmed, that Pandža had joined German Hessenliga club FV Bad Vilbel.

International career
Between 2008 and 2010, Pandža made 6 appearances for the Bosnia and Herzegovina U19 national team, making 6 appearances and scoring 1 goal in the process.

Style of play
Pandža can play as both right and a left winger.

Honours

Player

Club
Olimpik Sarajevo
Bosnian Cup: 2014–15

References

External links

1991 births
Living people
Footballers from Sarajevo
Croats of Bosnia and Herzegovina
Association football forwards
Bosnia and Herzegovina footballers
Bosnia and Herzegovina youth international footballers
FK Sarajevo players
GNK Dinamo Zagreb players
NK Lokomotiva Zagreb players
NK Sesvete players
NK Zvijezda Gradačac players
FK Olimpik players
Ironi Nesher F.C. players
Santarcangelo Calcio players
FK Mladost Doboj Kakanj players
Croatian Football League players
Premier League of Bosnia and Herzegovina players
Liga Leumit players
Serie C players
Hessenliga players
Bosnia and Herzegovina expatriate footballers
Expatriate footballers in Croatia
Bosnia and Herzegovina expatriate sportspeople in Croatia
Expatriate footballers in Israel
Bosnia and Herzegovina expatriate sportspeople in Israel
Expatriate footballers in Italy
Bosnia and Herzegovina expatriate sportspeople in Italy
Expatriate footballers in Germany
Bosnia and Herzegovina expatriate sportspeople in Germany